Tirukkural, or the Kural, an ancient Indian treatise on common moralities, has been given by various names ever since its writing between the first century BCE and the 5th century CE. Originally referred to as Muppāl, perhaps as presented by its author Valluvar himself at the ruler's court, the work remains unique among ancient works in that it was not given any title by its author himself. All the names that the work is referred by today are given by later days' scholars over the millennia. The work is known by an estimated 44 names excluding variants, although some scholars list even more. E. S. Ariel, a French scholar of the 19th century who translated the work into French, famously said of the Kural thus: Ce livre sans nom, par un autre sans nom ("The book without a name by an author without a name").

Etymology
Tirukkural was originally known as 'Muppāl', meaning three-sectioned book, as presented by its author himself at the king's court, since it contained three sections, viz., 'Aram', 'Porul' and 'Inbam'. Tolkappiyam divides various types of Tamil poetic forms into two, namely, kuruvenpāttu and neduvenpāttu. Kuruvenpāttu came to be called kural pāttu and, eventually, kural. The word kural applies in general to something that is short or abridged. In the words of Albert Schweitzer, "kural" means short strophe. More specifically, it is a very short Tamil poetic form consisting of two lines, the first line consisting of four words (known as cirs) and the second line consisting of three, which should also conform to the grammar of Venpa. It is one of the most important forms of classical Tamil language poetry. Thiru is a term denoting divine respect, literally meaning 'holy' or 'sacred'. Since the work was written in this poetic form, it came to be known as 'Tirukkural', meaning 'sacred couplets'.

List of names by which the work is known
The following table lists the various names the Kural text has been known by over the millennia.

See also

 Tirukkural

Citations

References

 
 
 
 
 
 
 
 
 
 
 
 

Tirukkural
Ancient India